

See also 
 United States House of Representatives elections, 1798 and 1799
 List of United States representatives from Tennessee

References 

1799
Tennessee
United States House of Representatives